Mong Hsu Township is a township of Loilen District in the Shan State of Myanmar. The principal town is Mong Hsu. 
Om-pu waterfall on Nam Parng River of Mong Hsu is the second largest waterfall of Shan State. The nearest commercial airport to Mong Hsu is Lashio Airport.

History
Mong Hsu is the home of the famous Mong Hsu ruby mines. The large scale production started in 1991. Before gems were found, it is a small remote town with 1-2 convoys for each month. And before 1959, it was governed by a sawbwa. 

The quality of its rubies are contested by dealers of precious rubies originating from Mogok.

There was forced displacement of native Shan population in Mong Hsu Township by the Myanmar Army in 1995. And several skirmishes between Myanmar Army and Shan State Army in 2011.

Beginning on 6 October 2015 a large scale offensive by the Tatmadaw comprising 20 Burma Army battalions has been launched in central Shan State. The aim of the military is to seize Shan ceasefire territories in Kehsi, Mong Hsu, Mong Nawng and Tangyan townships, using heavy artillery and with fighter jet and helicopter gunship air support to indiscriminately shell and bomb civilian areas. These attacks have displaced thousands of Shan, Palaung, Lisu and Lahu people causing a new humanitarian crisis.

Towns and Villages

References

Townships of Shan State
Loilen District